The Cooke Locomotive and Machine Works, located in Paterson, New Jersey, manufactured steam railroad locomotives from 1852 until it was merged with seven other manufacturers to form American Locomotive Company (ALCO) in 1901.

History
The firm was established in 1852 by former Rogers Locomotive and Machine Works superintendent (and son-in-law of William Swinburne of Swinburne, Smith and Company) John Cooke and former Montreal resident Charles Danforth as the Danforth, Cooke, and Company, as a manufacturer of steam locomotives as well as cotton machinery.  The company was renamed Danforth Locomotive and Machine Company in 1865, with Danforth serving as president until 1871, four years before his death in 1875.  Cooke succeeded Danforth as president in 1871, continuing in such capacity until his own death in 1882, after which Cooke's sons,  John, Frederick, and Charles reorganized the firm as the Cooke Locomotive and Machine Works, and continued operating the company as such until the merger in 1901.
In 1901, Cooke and several other locomotive manufacturers merged to form the American Locomotive Company; Cooke's plant becomes the Alco-Cooke Works, and locomotive production continued at the plant until 1926.  Approximately 2600 locomotives were built by Cooke from 1852 to 1901, among the most notable engines produced by the firm are the C. P. Huntington, and the Western & Atlantic Railroad "Texas".

Exports
In addition to providing motive power for North American railroads, Cooke has also produced many locomotives for Central and South America as well as other parts of the world.  Examples of exported locomotives include two 0-8-2 tank locomotives for the Port Talbot Railway and Docks Company, South Wales, in 1899, as well as Barry Railway's five class K 0-6-2T locomotives the same year.  The firm also produced 2-6-2T locomotives for the War Department Light Railways to be used in France during World War I, preserved examples of which can be found on the Froissy Dompierre Light Railway and Ffestiniog Railway.

Preserved Cooke locomotives
The following is a list of preserved locomotives built by Cooke before the ALCO merger in 1901. They are listed here in serial number order.

In addition to the above locomotives, the White Pass and Yukon Route railroad WP&YR owns and maintains a steam-powered snowplow built by Cooke in 1899. This unit is on static display in Skagway, Alaska (see Rotary snowplow for a photo).

The following is a list of preserved locomotives built at the Cooke factory after the ALCO merger.

References

 Steam Locomotive Builders
 Steam locomotive preservation information

Notes

External links 

Defunct locomotive manufacturers of the United States
 
History of Paterson, New Jersey
Economy of Paterson, New Jersey
Transportation in Paterson, New Jersey
Historic American Engineering Record in New Jersey
Industrial buildings and structures in New Jersey
Companies based in Passaic County, New Jersey